Guy Joseph Jean Charron (born January 24, 1949) is a Canadian former professional ice hockey centre. He played in the NHL from 1969–1981. He previously served as the head coach of the WHL's Kamloops Blazers. Guy is currently the Commissioner of the Thompson Okanagan Junior Lacrosse League.

Playing career
Originally a product of the Montreal Canadiens' system, Charron played twenty games with the Canadiens before he was traded during the middle of the 1970–71 NHL season to the Detroit Red Wings in the monster deal that sent Frank Mahovlich to Montreal.  He played with the Red Wings until he was traded to the expansion Kansas City Scouts in 1974.  Prior to the 1976–77 NHL season, Charron signed as a free agent with the Washington Capitals, where he played until he retired following the 1980–81 NHL season. Despite playing in 734 NHL regular season games, he never appeared in a single playoff game, which was an NHL record.

Awards
Won the 1999–2000 Commissioner's Trophy.

Career statistics

Regular season and playoffs

International

Coaching statistics

NHL head coaching

Minor league/assistant coaching

1 Midseason replacement

See also
Captain (ice hockey)

References

External links

1949 births
Living people
Anaheim Ducks coaches
Calgary Flames coaches
Canadian ice hockey centres
Detroit Red Wings players
Florida Panthers coaches
Ice hockey people from Montreal
Kamloops Blazers coaches
Kansas City Scouts players
Montreal Canadiens coaches
Montreal Canadiens players
Montreal Junior Canadiens players
Montreal Voyageurs players
National Hockey League assistant coaches
New Haven Nighthawks players
New York Islanders coaches
People from Verdun, Quebec
Washington Capitals captains
Washington Capitals players
Canadian ice hockey coaches